The men's featherweight event was part of the boxing programme at the 1960 Summer Olympics.  The weight class allowed boxers of up to 57 kilograms to compete. The competition was held from 26 August to 5 September 1960. 31 boxers from 31 nations competed.

Competition format

The competition was a straight single-elimination tournament, with no bronze medal match (two bronze medals were awarded, one to each semifinal loser).

Results

Results of the featherweight boxing competition.

Top half

Bottom half

Finals

References

Featherweight